All Alive and Merry is a 1737 comedy play by the British writer Samuel Johnson. The original Lincoln's Inn Fields cast included William Giffard, Charlotte Charke and Anna Marcella Giffard. It was staged by Henry Giffard's company which had recently moved from the Goodman's Fields Theatre in Whitechapel.

References

Bibliography
 Burling, William J. A Checklist of New Plays and Entertainments on the London Stage, 1700-1737. Fairleigh Dickinson Univ Press, 1992.
 Nicoll, Allardyce. A History of Early Eighteenth Century Drama: 1700-1750. CUP Archive, 1927.

1737 plays
West End plays
Comedy plays
Plays by Samuel Johnson